The National Association of Hispanic Nurses (NAHN) is a non-profit professional association in the United States, committed to the promotion of the professionalism and dedication of Hispanic nurses by providing equal access to educational, professional, and economic opportunities for Hispanic nurses.

History 

The National Association of Hispanic Nurses (NAHN) was founded in 1975 by Ildaura Murillo-Rohde. The year before, at an American Nurses Association meeting, a group of Hispanic nurses had met regarding the feasibility of establishing an ANA Hispanic caucus. Though they did not affiliate with ANA, the group established the National Association of Spanish-Speaking Spanish-Surnamed Nurses (NASSSN) in 1976. Murillo-Rohde incorporated NASSSN in Washington State in 1977 where, at that time, she was employed as Associate Dean of the School of Nursing at the University of Washington in Seattle.

The group was renamed as the National Association of Hispanic Nurses in 1979. NAHN launched its official professional peer-reviewed publication, Hispanic Health Care International (HHCI) at the 27th Annual Conference held July 2002 in Miami, Florida. It was initially published by Springer Publishing, but is now published by SAGE Publishing since 2016. HHCI is a bilingual journal (English and Spanish) and is published four times a year.

Leadership

National 
Leadership at the National Association of Hispanic Nurses consists of: an Executive Board including a President, President-Elect, Immediate Past-President, Treasurer, and Secretary, the Board of Directors including the Executive Board plus five Board Members, and an Executive Director.

Past Presidents:

1976-1979 Ildaura Murillo-Rohde, PhD, RN*, FAAN

1979-1980 Ildaura Murillo-Rohde, PhD, RN*, FAAN

1980-1982 Bertha Mujia, MSN, RN*

1982-1984 Hector Hugo Gonzalez, PhD, VR-RN (Retired)

1984-1986 Henrietta Villaescusa, MPH, RN*

1986-1988 Henrietta Villaescusa, MPH, RN*

1988-1990 Janie Menchaca Wilson, PhD, RN

1990-1992 Janie Menchaca Wilson, PhD, RN

1992-1994 Sara Torres, PhD, RN, FAAN

1994-1996 Sara Torres, PhD, RN, FAAN

1996-1998 Antonia Villarruel, PhD, RN, FAAN

1998-2000 Carmen Portillo, PhD, RN, FAAN

2000-2002 Mary Lou de Leon Siantz, PhD, RN, FAAN

2002-2004 Nilda (Nena) Peragallo, DrPH, RN, FAAN

2004-2006 Rev. Dr. Rudy Valenzuela, PhD, NP, FAANP, FAAN

2006-2008 Maria Tere Villot, BSN, RN

2008-2010 Norma Martinez-Rogers, PhD, RN, FAAN

2010-2012 Angie Millan, DNP, RN, FAAN

2012-2014 Jose Alejandro, PhD, RN, NEA-BC, MBA, CNE, FACHE, FAAN

2014-2016 Daniel Suarez, MA, RN, NYAM Fellow

2016-2018 Anabell Castro-Thompson, MSN, RN, ANP-C, FAAN, FAANP

2018-2020 Norma Cuellar, PhD, RN, FAAN

2020-2011 Alana Cueto, MSN, RN, CNL

2021-2022 Adriana Nava, PhD, RN, MPA

2022-2024 Adriana Nava, PhD, RN, MPA

Local chapters 
Leadership at the local level has shifted to mirror the national model. Instead of a Vice President, there is a President-Elect as well as the Immediate Past-President. This serves the function to maintain continuity and order as well as to ensure a smooth transition when electing new officials.

Annual conference 
Each summer, NAHN hosts a conference in which hundreds of nurses attend to discuss issues concerning the Hispanic community, share best evidence-based practices, and view exhibits from nurse researchers, nursing students, recruiters, nursing schools, non-governmental organizations such as the American Heart Association, and many research institutions from across the nation. Members in attendance participate in a community service project which during the 2015 conference was a rally to create over 10,000 meals to end world hunger through a partnership with Stop Hunger Now.

References 
About the National Association of Hispanic Nurses History Section

Nursing organizations in the United States
Hispanic and Latino American professional organizations
Medical and health organizations based in North Carolina